Elizabeth Partridge (born September 1, 1951) is an American writer, the author of more than a dozen books from young-adult nonfiction to picture books to photography books. Her books include Marching for Freedom (2009, Viking), as well the biographies John Lennon: All I Want Is the Truth (Viking, 2005), This Land Was Made for You and Me: The Life and Music of Woody Guthrie (Viking, 2002), and Restless Spirit: The Life and Work of Dorothea Lange (Viking, 1999). Her latest book is the middle grade novel, Dogtag Summer (Bloomsbury, 2011).

Partridge is the daughter of photographer Rondal Partridge and the granddaughter of photographer Imogen Cunningham and etcher Roi Partridge.

Partridge has been a National Book Award finalist, an ALA Michael L. Printz Award runner-up, and twice a Boston Globe–Horn Book Award runner-up. She has won the Los Angeles Times Book Prize, the SCBWI Golden Kite Award, and the Jane Addams Children's Book Award.

Partridge is on the faculty of the Vermont College of Fine Arts in the MFA in Writing for Children & Young Adults. She chaired the National Book Award Committee for Young People's Literature in 2007 and has served on the Los Angeles Times Book Prize Committee and the SCBWI Golden Kite Award committee.

Publications

Young adult nonfiction 
Restless Spirit: the Life and Work of Dorothea Lange (Viking, 1998)
This Land Was Made For You and Me: The Life and Songs of Woody Guthrie (Viking, 2002)
John Lennon: All I Want Is the Truth (Viking, 2005)
Marching for Freedom: Walk Together, Children, and Don't You Grow Weary (Viking 2009)
Boots on the Ground: America's War in Vietnam (Viking, 2018)

Adult nonfiction 
Dorothea Lange: A Visual Life (Smithsonian University Press, 1993)
Quizzical Eye: The Photography of Rondal Partridge (Heyday Press, 2003)

Novels 
Clara and the Hoodoo Man. (Dutton Children's Books, 1996)
Dogtag Summer. (Bloomsbury Children's Books, 2011)

Picture books 
Pigs Eggs, Illustrated by Martha Weston. (Globe Books, 2000)
Oranges on Golden Mountain, Illustrated by Aki Sogabi. (Dutton Children's Books, 2002) 
Moon Glowing, Illustrated by Joan Paley.(Dutton Children's Books, 2002) 
Kogi's Mysterious Journey, Illustrated by Aki Sogabi. (Dutton Children's Books, 2003) 
Whistling, Illustrated by Anna Grossnickle Hines. (Harper Collins, 2003) 
Big Cat Pepper, Illustrated by Lauren Castille. (Bloomsbury Children's Books, 2009)

Essays and short stories 
"Looking for America," Open Your Eyes: Extraordinary Experiences in Faraway Places. (Viking, 2003)
"This Was America, 1960," John F. Kennedy: The Inaugural Address. (Viking, 2010)

Awards and runners-up, etc. 
Marching for Freedom: Walk Together Children and Don't You Grow Weary
 Boston Globe-Horn Book Award runner-up
 Los Angeles Times Book Prize for Young Adult Literature
 Jane Addams Children's Book Award
 School Library Journal's Battle of the Books
 2011Tayshas Reading List (2011)
 Int'l Reading Association Teachers’ Choice Children’s Book Council 2010:
 Notable Social Studies Trade Books
 International Reading Association 2010 Notable Books for a Global Society
 Capitol Choices Noteworthy Books for Children
 ALA Notable Children's Book
 ALA Best Books for Young Adults
 Booklist Editors' Choice: Books for Youth
 Horn Book Fanfare Choice
 Kirkus Reviews Best Children and YA Books of 2009
 Publishers Weekly Best Children's Books of 2009
 School Library Journal Best Books of the Year (2009)
 Booklist Top Ten Black History Books for Youth
 New York Public Library's Children’s Books 100 Titles for Reading and Sharing
 California Book Award: Young Adult Finalist
 Pennsylvania School Librarians Association YA Top Forty (2009)
 
John Lennon: All I Want is the Truth
 Michael L. Printz Award honor book
 ALA Best Books for Young Adults
 School Library Journal Best Books
 Booklist Editor's Choice
 Horn Book Fanfare
 BCCB Blue Ribbon
 Kirkus Best Books
 
This Land Was Made for You and Me: The Life and Songs of Woody Guthrie
 National Book Award finalist
 Boston Globe–Horn Book Award for Nonfiction runner-up
 SCBWI Golden Kite Award, Nonfiction
 ALA Top Ten Best Books for Young Adults
 ALA Notable Book
 School Library Journal Best Books
 Booklist Editor's Choice
 Horn Book Fanfare
 BCCB Blue Ribbon
 Publishers Weekly Best Books of the Year
 New York Public Library's 100 Titles for Reading and Sharing
 
Restless Spirit: The Life and Work of Dorothea Lange
 Jane Addams Award honor book
 SCBWI Golden Kite Award, Nonfiction honor book
 ALA Best Books for Young Adults
 ALA Notable Book
 Booklist Editor's Choice
 Bay Area Book Reviewers Award
 
Kogi's Mysterious Journey
 CBC-Notable Social Studies Trade Books for Young Readers
 New York Public Library's Children's Books: 100 Titles for Reading and Sharing 2003
 
Clara and the Hoodoo Man
 Women's National Book Association, Judy Lopez Memorial honor book

References

External links

1951 births
Living people
American children's writers
Children's non-fiction writers
Writing teachers
Place of birth missing (living people)
American women children's writers
21st-century American women